The first issue of The Blue Mountains Times appeared on Friday, 16 October 1931.

History
The first issue of The Blue Mountains Times appeared on Friday, 16 October 1931. It circulated from Mount Victoria to Hazelbrook/Woodford and was printed and published at the office of Joseph Bennett & Son in Cascade Street, Katoomba, for Lorin Grant Christie. From August 1937 Ralph Bennett is listed as the proprietor. (Bennett says the paper was taken over by the management of The Katoomba Daily, Blue Mountains Newspapers Ltd., and soon closed.)

Digitisation
The Blue Mountains Times has been digitised as part of the Australian Newspapers Digitisation Program project of the National Library of Australia.

See also
List of newspapers in New South Wales
List of newspapers in Australia

References

External links
 

Defunct newspapers published in Katoomba, New South Wales
Newspapers on Trove